Bayside DART station is a railway station in Fingal, Ireland that serves the district of Bayside and Baldoyle. It has an island platform accessible by pedestrian subways. The ticket office is open between 05:45-00:30 AM, Monday to Sunday.

History
The station opened on 11 June 1973.

See also
 List of railway stations in Ireland

References

External links 
 Irish Rail Bayside Station website

Iarnród Éireann stations in Fingal
Railway stations opened in 1973
Railway stations in Fingal
Bayside, Dublin
1973 establishments in Ireland
Railway stations in the Republic of Ireland opened in the 20th century